This article details the use of telephone numbers in Austria.

There are no standard lengths for either area codes or subscriber numbers in Austria, meaning that some subscriber numbers may be as short as three digits. Larger towns have shorter area codes permitting longer subscriber numbers in that area. Some examples:

Mobile phone codes 
In ascending numeric order:

1 Telering was bought by T-Mobile in 2005. As of 2006, Telering uses the network-infrastructure of T-Mobile. As a special requirement of the European commission, many of the former transmitters and frequencies previously operated by Telering were given to Orange and Drei.
2 BoB is a discount service of A1. yesss! was a discount service of Orange, now sold to A1. Eety is a discount service of Orange (now 3).

Due to Mobile number portability, the code is not an accurate way to determine the provider of a mobile phone number. The providers assign only in exceptional cases (special sort of custom numbers, more expensive) non-existing numbers with a different prefix, and this is handled similarly to porting an existing number from the desired network. However, the providers still have administrative sovereignty over their own prefixes.

Special / Service codes

References 
 Austrian Numbering Plan/Nationale Rufnummern

 
Austria communications-related lists